The Island Eye News is a newspaper that serves several islands around the Charleston area, including Sullivan's Island, the Isle of Palms, Dewees Island, and Goat Island. The newspaper has been in existence for over 15 years, starting in May 2005.

The paper has an average circulation of 5,311.

It has two websites: 

It has ten employees that work with the paper as it comes out every other Friday.

Publisher Lynn Pierotti, Editor Brian Sherman, Marketing Director Lori Dalton  Graphic Designer Swan Richards

References

Newspapers published in South Carolina